In Japan, relative poverty is defined as a state at which the income of a household is at or below half of the median household income. According to OECD figures, the mean household net-adjusted disposable income for Japan is US$23,458, higher than the OECD member state average of US$22,387. Unlike several other modern countries, Japan has no official poverty line, making it difficult to get accurate figures on those suffering impoverished conditions. It was estimated in 2006, using the Employment Status Survey, that 8.2% of regular employees made little enough to be considered working poor. In October 2009, Japan's Labor Ministry released a report which stated that almost one in six Japanese, which would be 22 million people, lived in poverty.

Japan's welfare ministry put forward a request in 2012 national budget to come up with a new poverty index. This request was submitted so that the new index could include important factors affecting poverty, namely, health, food, clothing and living conditions. In 2013, the Japanese government recorded relative poverty rates of 16%. This was the highest on record. Another study showed that 1 out of 3 Japanese women ages 20–64 and living alone were living in poverty. Japan has some of the highest rates of child poverty in the developed world, according to a UNICEF report. It ranked Japan 34th out of 41 industrialised countries. According to Japan's Health Ministry statistics, as of May 2017, 16% of Japanese children live below the poverty line.

Reports and findings
Unlike in other countries, only a few indicators of poverty are visible to people despite the fact that a significant portion of the population live in poverty.

Domestic reports

2009
In October 2009, Japan's Labor Ministry released a report which stated that almost one in six Japanese, which would be 22 million people, lived in poverty, in 2007. This revelation was met with shock and surprise among the Japanese people.

2013
In 2013, the Japanese government recorded relative poverty rates of 16% which was defined as the share of the population living on less than half the national median income. This was the highest on record.

Demographics
Another study showed that 1 out of 3 Japanese women ages 20–64 and living alone were living in poverty.

International reports
Several international organizations have conducted surveys and studies in Japan to estimate the poverty rate.

OECD findings
The OECD reported in July 2006 that Japan suffers high rates of relative poverty. Another OECD report stated that Japan was second worst in poverty among the OECD member nations, in the mid 2000s.
The OECD, in April 2011, placed Japan at the 29th position out of 34 member nations, in the list of percentage of population living in poverty. With 15.7 percent of people in poverty, Japan was above the average percent of 11 among the OECD member states. Japan's 15.7% is above countries which have fewer resources and are less developed than Japan, namely, Slovak Republic (6.5%), Slovenia (7.2%), and Poland (10.1%) Poverty rate is increasing at an alarming rate of 1.3% in Japan, since 1985. The poverty rate increase average is 1.0% annually for all other OECD member nations. The OECD report places Japan just below U.S.A., which has a 17.3% poverty measure, statistics indicate that U.S.A. has been cutting down on poverty, by a 0.7% decrease since 1985.

Japan's working poor
Unlike several other modern countries, Japan has no official poverty line, making it difficult to get accurate figures on those suffering impoverished conditions. Instead Japan measures poverty based on a "minimum standard of living" calculated using median income, the OECD index and other factors differing from prefecture to prefecture. Still, it is estimated that in 2006, when measuring on an individual basis using the Employment Status Survey, that 8.2% of regular employees made little enough to be considered working poor. Several factors have been found to be correlated with the working poor including single-parent households, shortcomings of the Public Assistance System, unstable employment and minimum wage insufficient to cover a minimum standard of living. Irregular workers tend to be members of the working poor and are often the result of Japanese companies restructuring. These workers also tend to be homeless, and reside in areas generally away from the public eye with well known homeless "villages" existing such as Hakenmura, a homeless village compared by scholar Toru Shinoda to the United States' Hooverville. Members of these communities tend to become day laborers, who by their nature are irregular workers.

Saitama starvation case
On February 20, 2012, the death of a family of three people was reported from Saitama due to starvation - an elderly couple and their 39-year-old son. The family could not afford to pay the rent, and electricity had been cut off. Unable to pay for heating, hypothermia is also suspected to be the cause of their death.

Child poverty
With regard to poor children in Japan, it has been estimated that 3.5 million Japanese children – or one in six of those aged up to 17 – belong to households experiencing relative poverty, defined by the OECD as those with incomes at or below half the median national disposable income. However, according to Japan's Health Ministry statistics, as in May 2017, 16 percent of Japanese children live below the poverty line. Japan has some of the highest rates of child poverty in the developed world, according to a Unicef report released in April 2016 that ranked Japan 34th out of 41 industrialised countries. It has also been estimated that only 200,000 of the 3.5 million poor children receive child support.

See also
Homelessness in Japan

References